The 2007 FIBA Asia Championship for Men was the qualifying tournament for FIBA Asia at the men's basketball tournament at the 2008 Summer Olympics at Beijing. The tournament was held in Tokushima, Japan from July 28 to August 5, 2007.

Participating teams qualified through the previous edition of this tournament and others through regional qualifiers. Since China is assured of an automatic berth at the 2008 Olympics as the host nation, the champions will automatically qualify while the two best teams excluding China qualifies for the 2008 FIBA World Olympic Qualifying Tournament for Men. This resulted in China deploying another team in this tournament, while their primary team led by NBA star Yao Ming and rookie Yi Jianlian participated in the Stankovic Cup and tournaments and friendlies with countries across Europe to prepare themselves.

Iran won their first championship after beating 2-time silver medalists Lebanon, 74–69. Korea upended Kazakhstan to clinch third place, and the last Asian berth in the FIBA pre-Olympic tournament, together with Lebanon.

Qualification

According to the FIBA Asia rules, each zone had two places, and the hosts (Japan) and holders (China) were automatically qualified. The other four places are allocated to the zones according to performance in the 2005 FIBA Asia Championship.

Draw
The draw was held on June 6 at Tokushima. The teams were grouped first into four pots, each member of the pot is guaranteed not to face each other in the preliminary round; the top four finishers of 2005 FIBA Asia Championship are seeded in order of their finish and hence are on one pot. Japan as the host has the right to choose which group it will be under.

* Saudi Arabia withdrew from the tournament,  replaced them.

Squads

Preliminary round

Group A

Group B

Group C

Group D

Quarterfinal round

Group E

Group F

Group G

Group H

Classification 9th–16th

15th place

13th place

11th place

9th place

Classification 5th–8th

Semifinals

7th place

5th place

Final round

Semifinals

3rd place

Final

Final standing

Awards

Statistical leaders

Points

Rebounds

Assists

Steals

Blocks

References 
 2007 FIBA Asia Championship official website

External links 
 FIBA Asia official website

 
2007
2007–08 in Asian basketball
International basketball competitions hosted by Japan
2007 in Japanese sport
July 2007 sports events in Asia
August 2007 sports events in Asia